The Rivers State Ministry of Information and Communications is a ministry within the Government of Rivers State that is entrusted with formulating and implementing strategies to develop and promote the media sector in the state. The ministry is also responsible for the management and dissemination of information on government policies, programmes and activities. The Incumbent commissioner is Paulinus Nsirim.

See also
List of government ministries of Rivers State

References

External links
Rivers State Ministry of Information and Communications

Information
Communications ministries
Mass media in Rivers State